Hean Sahib (born 9 October 1962) is an economist and a Secretary of State of the Ministry of Economy and Finance(MEF) of the Royal Government of Cambodia.

Career
Mr. Hean Sahib was born in 1962 in Kampot, Cambodia. In his early career, Sahib was the first Director of the Economics and Finance Institute (EFI) of the Ministry of Economy and Finance (MEF), which was established in 1997. Through capacity building, EFI has contributed towards a smooth transition of the national economic system from a planned economy to a free market economy, and has trained public servants in the fields of economics and public finance to be ready for Cambodia's integration into ASEAN in 1999. He has been serving as the Chairman of the MEF's Working Group on Capacity Building for the Government Officials.

In these roles, he has paved the way for MEF's human resource development system and strategies. Under his leadership, EFI has attracted technical and financial supports from key development partners, such as the EU, World Bank, IMF, UNDP, ADB, JICA, SIDA, and Temasek Foundation International. EFI has also established close cooperation and collaboration with international training and research institutes, including Charles Sturt University of Australia, Korea Development Institute, Nanyang Technological University of Singapore, Asia-Pacific Finance and Development Institute of China, and Civil Service College Singapore. 

Mr Hean Sahib has led a nationwide project called “Financial Management Information System - FMIS”, which has helped to improve efficiency, accountability, transparency, and good governance over the usage of the national budget. This, in turn, ensures sustainable growth and poverty reduction and supports the Public Financial Management Reform Program of the Royal Government of Cambodia.

Mr Hean Sahib is Chairman of the Private Investment Project Review Team with the primary goal of managing public finance and state property while ensuring an optimal balance among assisting and also providing incentives, promoting economic growth and efficiently collecting revenues. He has held a number of important roles in socio-economic development policy including vice chairman and secretary general of the Supreme National Economic Council (SNEC) along with  many others. He is currently a Permanent Vice Chairman of the Supreme National Economic Council with Senior Minister rank. He is also the Chairman of the Cambodia Securities Exchange, a member of the Board of Directors of the Royal School of Administration, and a member of the Board of Directors of the Royal Academy of Cambodia.

Education
Mr Hean Sahib received his Master's degree and Ph.D. in economics from the Kyiv State University in 1991 and 1994, respectively. His research interests are on economic policy, public finance, and private sector development strategy. He has authored books and papers, covering public economics and the roles of government in the economy. He is a professor of economics at public higher education institutions in Cambodia, including the Royal School of Administration, the Royal Academy of Cambodia, and the Economics and Finance Institute, where he has trained and mentored numerous Cambodian students, researchers, entrepreneurs, young leaders, and governmental officials. Because of these outstanding contributions, he has the honours to receive the full membership of the Royal Academy of Cambodia and is entitled as “PANDIT SABHA CHAR” (Academician) by the King of the Kingdom of Cambodia in 2018.

Publications
In 2021, he published another book, “Economists’ Thought and Economics.” In this book, Sahib stresses the critical roles of “Dynamics of Stakeholder System”, “Check and Balance” and “Value System” concepts in building good governance, especially institutional reform. He is an advocate of meritocracy, human resource development, and the use of information and digital technologies in management and decision-making. Sahib espouses the mixed economic system (the third way) as his Economic philosophy. He once argues that: “Market economy is fair but inequitable, whereas planned economy is equitable but unfair. Both economic systems have evolved and then developed the mixed economy, where both the state and the market play core, critical roles in the economy.”

References

1965 births
Living people
Government ministers of Cambodia
Finance ministers of Cambodia
Cambodian Buddhists
People from Phnom Penh